Johannes Krisch (born 1966) is an Austrian actor. He has appeared in more than forty films since 1987.

Selected filmography

References

External links 

1966 births
Living people
Austrian male film actors